I Have to Sleep, My Angel is a 2007 Croatian drama film directed by Dejan Aćimović.

Cast 
 Karlo Barbarić - Goran
 Nataša Dorčić - Majka
 Franjo Dijak - Inspektor
 Goran Grgić - Otac
 Vera Zima - Baka
 Miralem Zubčević - Djed
 Olga Pakalović - Mirjana
 Ksenija Marinković - Biljana
 Doris Šarić-Kukuljica - Safija
 Zrinka Radić - Lucija
 Gordana Gadžić - Marija

References

External links 

2007 drama films
2007 films
Croatian drama films